The Shambolic Birth and Early Life Of is a promo compilation album by The Flaming Lips, released in 2002. It summarizes the first six years of The Flaming Lips. Released with limited distribution in music shops to promote Finally the Punk Rockers Are Taking Acid and The Day They Shot a Hole in the Jesus Egg, it is similar in many respects to the 1998 compilation 1984-1990.

Track listing

References

The Flaming Lips compilation albums
2002 compilation albums